Batamenak is an extended play released by Egyptian singer and actress Sherine. Batamenak was released by the Saudi Arabian studio recording company Rotana Records in 2008.

Track listing 
 Batamenak
 Bekelma menak
 Ana Mosh Bitat El Kalam Da (Remix)
 Mesh Ayiza Gheirak Enta
 Barag'a Nafsy
 Mesh Ayiza Gheirak Enta (Remix)

Reception 
Batamenak topped many Arabic charts, selling millions of CDs. According to Rateyourmusic.com, Batamenak was listed as 19 out of the 30 best Arabic Albums of the year 2008.

References

Sherine albums
2008 albums